ERC Freiburg is a defunct European elite ice hockey team that was based in Freiburg, Germany. They played in the German top-tier Eishockey-Bundesliga from 1979 to 1984 (relegated to the 2nd tier 2nd Bundesliga from 1980 to 1983).

References

Defunct ice hockey teams in Europe
Ice hockey teams in Germany
Sport in Freiburg im Breisgau
Ice hockey teams in Baden-Württemberg